The uniqueness theorem for Poisson's equation states that, for a large class of boundary conditions, the equation may have many solutions, but the gradient of every solution is the same. In the case of electrostatics, this means that there is a unique electric field derived from a potential function satisfying Poisson's equation under the boundary conditions.


Proof
The general expression for Poisson's equation in electrostatics is

The uniqueness of the solution can be proven for a large class of boundary conditions as follows.

Suppose that we claim to have two solutions of Poisson's equation. Then

 and

Subtracting the two solutions above gives 

By applying the vector differential identity we know that

However, from  we also know that throughout the region   Consequently, the second term goes to zero and we find that

By taking the volume integral over the region , we find that

By applying the divergence theorem, we rewrite the expression above as

We now sequentially consider three distinct boundary conditions: a Dirichlet boundary condition, a Neumann boundary condition, and a mixed boundary condition.

Consequently, we find that

Since this is the volume integral of a positive quantity (due to the squared term), we must have  at all points. Finally, since   throughout the whole region, and since  throughout the whole region, therefore  throughout the whole region. This completes the proof that there is the unique solution of Poisson's equation with a Dirichlet boundary condition.

Consequently, as before, we find that

As before, since this is the volume integral of a positive quantity, we must have  at all points. Finally, since  throughout the whole region, and since  throughout the whole region, therefore  throughout the whole region. This completes the proof that there is the unique solution up to an additive constant of Poisson's equation with a Neumann boundary condition.

Mixed boundary conditions could be given as long as either the gradient or the potential is specified at each point of the boundary. Boundary conditions at infinity also hold. This results from the fact that the surface integral in  still vanishes at large distances because the integrand decays faster than the surface area grows.

See also
Poisson's equation
Gauss's law
Coulomb's law
Method of images
Green's function
Uniqueness theorem
Spherical harmonics

References

Electrostatics
Vector calculus
Uniqueness theorems
Theorems in calculus